The San Jose State Spartans football team represents San José State University in NCAA Division I FBS college football as a member of the Mountain West Conference.

History

Early history (1893–1970)

San Jose State first fielded a football team in 1893 under head coach James E. Addicott. Addicott also served as a math professor at the California State Normal School (now San José State University). The team played a local YMCA club in 1893 and 1894 and garnered its first tie in 1896, a 6–6 decision against nearby rival College of the Pacific.

The first regular football seasons began in 1898 and mostly consisted of games against local high schools and some colleges and junior colleges.

During the 1920s the football program began playing home games at "Spartan Field," future home of Spartan Stadium. In the 1930s and 1940s, the Spartan football program was considered a powerhouse, posting 12 consecutive winning seasons and earning eight conference championship titles over an 18-year span. The 1932 and 1939 teams went 7–0–2 and 13–0 respectively, the only undefeated seasons in school history. 

San Jose State first appeared in the national rankings in 1939 when the AP Poll ranked the Spartans No. 19 in week seven. The team would climb to No. 18 in week eight. Lloyd Thomas was the first San Jose State player to receive first-team All-America honors. Thomas played as a defensive end on the 1936, 1937 and 1938 teams that fielded a combined win-loss record of 27–7–1. As of 2022, SJSU has produced over 90 All-America team members, including seven first-team selections.

Spartan Stadium (now known as CEFCU Stadium) was built on the original Spartan Field site and completed in 1933 with a capacity of 18,000. The Spartans won the first football game played in the stadium 44–6 over San Francisco State on October 7, 1933.

The San Jose State Spartans football team served unexpectedly with the Honolulu Police Department during World War II. The team had just arrived in Hawaii to play a series of post-season bowl games against Hawaii and the Willamette University Bearcats when the U.S. Navy base at Pearl Harbor was attacked on December 7, 1941. The team was stranded on the islands for a number of weeks following the attack, and players were employed by the local police department to help improve island defenses against a possible Japanese amphibious assault and as guards for military bases on the island.

The Spartan football program posted just six winning seasons in the 1950s and 1960s, but the 1970s would usher in a string of successful seasons spanning 20 years.

Winning era (1971–1992)
From 1971 to 1992, San Jose State posted 15 winning seasons, won eight conference titles, appeared in four bowl games and sent nearly 50 players to the NFL.

SJSU's first win over a nationally ranked opponent occurred in 1971 when the Spartans defeated No. 10 Stanford 13–12 on November 13. Stanford would go on to defeat Michigan in the Rose Bowl that season. SJSU's second win over a ranked opponent occurred four years later in 1975, when the Spartans defeated No. 15 Stanford 36–34 in a nationally televised game on September 27. San Jose State also had victories over No. 10 Baylor in 1980, No. 19 Fresno State in 1986, and No. 23 Fresno State in 1990.

From 1971–1992, SJSU garnered 23 victories over current Power Five conference opponents. These victories included eight wins over Stanford, five wins over Cal and three over Oregon. 

In 1975, San Jose State appeared in the national rankings for the first time in over 30 years when the team was ranked No. 20 in the AP Poll in week 13. SJSU later earned its first post-season national ranking in 1990 when the Spartans finished No. 20 in the Coaches Poll.

Two stadium expansions and renovations in the 1980s increased the Spartan Stadium seating capacity from 18,000 to 31,218.

Decline (1993–2004)
From 1993 to 2004, San Jose State had just one winning season when the team finished 7–5 in 2000; however, the team did earn two wins over ranked opponents during this period. The Spartans claimed a 25–22 victory over No. 24 Air Force in 1997 and a 27–24 win over No. 9 TCU in a nationally televised game in 2000. The Spartans also defeated rival Stanford three consecutive years from 1998 to 2000.

By the spring of 2004, the combination of rising costs for the football program and budget cuts from the state led some San Jose State faculty members to advocate dropping football.

In 2004, San Jose State defeated the Rice Owls 70–63 in a game that set the NCAA Division I record for total points scored and total touchdowns in a non-overtime game.

Dick Tomey era (2005–2009)

Coach Dick Tomey took over the program in 2005 amid Academic Progress Rate (APR) shortcomings that would result in severe penalties imposed by the NCAA. After showing moderate improvement that year, the Spartans had a breakout season in 2006. It was the team's best season since joining the WAC ten years prior. Tomey guided the Spartans to a 9–4 record, a win over rival Fresno State, and a win over New Mexico in the 2006 New Mexico Bowl, thus ending the team's 16-year bowl drought.  The 2006 Spartan squad produced two 2007 NFL draft picks in wide receivers James Jones and John Broussard.

From 2007 through the 2009 seasons, the program was hit with heavy NCAA sanctions for failing to meet APR standards. By the start of the 2009 season, the Spartans had lost 57 scholarships over a four-year period. By the spring of 2010, the NCAA penalties were lifted and a full complement of 85 scholarships was restored.

The 2007 team was not as successful as the previous year's team, with the Spartans finishing 5–7 and fifth in the WAC. The post-season showed a positive result, however, with several players being named to all-star games including Dwight Lowery, Marcus Teland, Matt Castelo and Adam Tafralis. The Spartans produced another draft pick in the 2008 NFL Draft, in defensive back Dwight Lowery. Lowery was named a 1st-team All-America winner in 2007.

The 2008 roster gave the school its best start since joining the WAC. The Spartans jumped to 5–2 and led the WAC for three weeks until losing to Boise State. The Spartans finished the season in sixth place in the WAC with a conference record of 4–4 and a 6–6 overall record. Three players were picked in the 2009 NFL Draft, those being defensive tackle Jarron Gilbert, defensive back Christopher Owens and defensive back Coye Francies

After playing an unusually tough non-conference schedule, the 2009 Spartans finished 2–10 with wins over Cal Poly and New Mexico State. Head Coach Dick Tomey announced in November he would retire at the close of the season, thus ending his legendary coaching career. Tomey's record at SJSU was 25–35.

Mike MacIntyre era (2010–2012)
On December 17, 2009, Mike MacIntyre was formally introduced as Tomey's replacement. MacIntyre was previously the defensive coordinator at Duke University.

San Jose State finished 1–12 in 2010 and 5–7 in 2011 under MacIntyre. In MacIntyre's third season, the 2012 San Jose State Spartans football team finished 11–2 including a win over Bowling Green in the 2012 Military Bowl. The 2012 team earned top-25 post-season rankings in the Associated Press (AP), Coaches and BCS polls. Kent Baer served as interim head coach for the Military Bowl because MacIntyre resigned to accept the head coach position at Colorado.

Ron Caragher era (2013–2016)
Ron Caragher, previously the head coach at the University of San Diego, became the SJSU head coach following the conclusion of the 2012 football season. Caragher's team finished a disappointing 6–6 in 2013, however, that season did include a 62–52 upset win over No. 16 Fresno State to close out the year. The team finished 3–9 in 2014, 6–7 in 2015 and 4–8 in 2016.  On November 27, 2016, Caragher was relieved of his duties as head coach after compiling a 19–30 (.388) win-loss record and only one bowl appearance over four seasons.

Brent Brennan era (2017–present)
Oregon State wide receivers coach Brent Brennan, who was a San Jose State assistant under Tomey and MacIntyre from 2005 to 2010, took over as head coach in 2017. In Brennan's first two years as head coach, the Spartans won just three games. This included a 1–11 season in 2018. Despite the poor record, five of the team's losses in 2018 were by fewer than nine points, and three were by a field goal. 

The 2019 team improved to 5–7, missing bowl eligibility by one win. The Spartans also showed promise by defeating Arkansas on the road in 2019 for the program's first win over a Southeastern Conference team. Additionally, the 2019 Spartan team defeated Army, making the Spartans one of only 20 teams in college football to defeat all three FBS service academies (Army, Air Force, and Navy). Brennan received a contract extension at the close of the 2019 season.

The COVID-19 pandemic impacted the 2020 season, with restrictions imposed by Santa Clara County prompting the team to conduct preseason practice at Humboldt State University. The pandemic also resulted in the cancellation of all four non-conference games and two games against Mountain West Conference opponents. Santa Clara County public health orders also forced the Spartans' last two home games to be relocated to Aloha Stadium in Hawaii and Sam Boyd Stadium in Las Vegas.

The abbreviated 2020 campaign would be a breakout year for the Spartans, who won each of their six regular season games for their first 6–0 start since 1939. The Spartans also cracked the AP Poll top-25 for the first time since 2012 and debuted in the College Football Playoff ranking at No. 24.

The Spartans qualified for the Mountain West Conference championship game for the first time, where they defeated Boise State 34–20. In addition to giving San Jose State its maiden win over Boise State, the victory gave the Spartans their first conference championship title since 1991. Brennan was named the Mountain West Conference Coach of the Year and also received the 2020 Lombardi Foundation national Coach of the Year award.

Conference affiliations

The San Jose State football team has been affiliated with six different athletics conferences since joining the California Coast Conference in 1922.
 Independent (1893–1921)
 California Coast Conference (1922–1928)
 Northern California Athletic Conference (Also known as the Far West Conference) (1929–1935)
 Independent (1936–1938)
 California Collegiate Athletic Association (1939–1949)
 Independent (1950–1968)
 Big West Conference (Also known as the Pacific Coast Athletic Association) (1969–1995)
 Western Athletic Conference (1996–2012)
 Mountain West Conference (2013–present)

Conference championships
San Jose State has won 17 conference championships. From 1969 to 1995, San Jose State earned more Big West Conference football championship titles than any other team in the history of the Big West Conference. The Spartans moved to the WAC in 1996 and later moved to the Mountain West Conference in 2013.

† Co–champions

Bowl games

San Jose State has made 12 bowl appearances and has an overall bowl game record of 7–5.

Home stadium

Known as Spartan Stadium for over eight decades, CEFCU stadium officially opened in 1933 as a 4,000-seat facility. The stadium featured large berms on the east, west, north and south sides of the field, which gave the stadium a "sunken bowl" appearance. The stadium's seating capacity was increased to 8,500 in 1936, and later expanded incrementally to a total seating capacity of just over 18,000 by 1948. The most recent additions came in the 1980s when the capacity of the stadium was expanded from approximately 18,000 to just over 31,000 by adding end zone bleachers, an upper deck and boxes on the west side.

In 1998, the field was widened and other renovations were carried out for the MLS San Jose Earthquakes soccer team in accordance with official FIFA regulations. As a result of these renovations, parts of the stands closest to the playing field were removed, thus lowering available seating for all sports to 30,456. In 2019, seating capacity was temporarily reduced to 21,520 as part of a massive east-side stadium renovation project. The project is scheduled to be completed in August 2023.

In August 2016, Citizens Equity First Credit Union purchased sole naming rights to Spartan Stadium for $8.7 million. The deal between CEFCU and San José State University will last for 15 years.

Other distinctive and unique features of the stadium include the original 1933 Romanesque balustrade spanning the entire east and west sidelines and the CEFCU Stadium "Ring of Honor" displayed along the west side upper deck.

Rivalries

Fresno State
The Battle for the Valley Trophy

San Jose State's biggest rival is California State University, Fresno, due in large part to the two schools' geographic proximity and long history of competing in the same conferences.

Fresno is the largest city in the agriculturally rich San Joaquin Valley. San Jose is the largest city in the metropolitan capital of the high-tech Silicon Valley. The two schools are separated by approximately 150 driving miles. Beginning in 2013, the winner of the game is awarded the Valley Trophy.

San Jose State led the series from 1949 to 2001, but Fresno State tied it at 32–32–3 with a victory in 2002 and recaptured the lead in 2003. The Bulldogs and Spartans first played each other in 1921.

As of 2022, Fresno State leads the football series 44–38–3. The two schools have met on the gridiron 85 times.

Stanford
Bill Walsh Legacy Game

The Bill Walsh Legacy Game is the name given to the rivalry between the Spartans and the Stanford Cardinal football team of Stanford University. 

The rivalry is likely rooted in the two schools' close geographical proximity to one another, with the Stanford University campus being located just 23 driving miles northwest of the San Jose State campus on Interstate 280. The two teams have played each other 67 times since 1900. The rivalry is currently on hiatus due to non-conference scheduling conflicts, however, on June 22, 2022, Stanford and San Jose State announced an agreement to renew the rivalry with a four game home-and-home series beginning in 2025. 

Stanford currently leads the series 52–14–1.

Hawaii
Dick Tomey Legacy Game

The two schools first met in 1936, and each team was previously led by legendary coach Dick Tomey. Tomey was a successful head coach at Hawaii from 1977 to 1986 and was a successful head coach at San Jose State from 2005 to 2009. The winner of the rivalry game each year takes possession of the Dick Tomey Legacy Trophy. The  Rainbow Warriors and Spartans have played each other 45 times as of the 2022 season.

In 1941, the San Jose State Spartans football team served unexpectedly with the Honolulu Police Department during World War II. The team had just arrived in Hawaii to play a series of postseason bowl games against the Hawaii Rainbow Warriors and the Willamette University Bearcats when the U.S. Navy base at Pearl Harbor was attacked on December 7, 1941. The team was stranded on the islands for a number of weeks following the attack, and players were employed by the local police department to help improve island defenses against a possible Japanese amphibious assault and as guards for military bases on the island.

As of 2022, the series is tied at 22–22–1.

San Diego State
El Camino Real Rivalry

The rivalry between the two Cal State schools dates back to 1935. The matchup is named after the historic 600-mile Camino Real that connects the 21 Spanish missions in California, stretching from San Diego Bay in the south to San Francisco Bay in the north. The San Diego State Aztecs and San Jose State Spartans have played each other 46 times as of the 2022 season. 

In 2014, there were conversations between the two programs about creating a trophy using an old mission bell or a replica of an old Spanish mission bell to be awarded to the winner of the rivalry game, but no trophy ever materialized. 

The Spartans currently have the longest win streak in the series with 11 consecutive wins from 1938 to 1952.

As of 2022, San Diego State leads the series 24–20–2.

Nevada
The University of Nevada, Reno and San Jose State first played each other in 1899. The Wolf Pack won the first meeting 6–0 in Reno on Thanksgiving Day. Bob Brule scored the game’s only touchdown and fell into an irrigation ditch behind the end zone, followed by three Cal State Normal School players.

The series was tied at seven wins apiece at the close of the 2001 season, but SJSU fell to 4–16 against Nevada over the following 20 seasons (2002–2022). The two schools did not play each other from 1901–1930 and again from 1949–1991. Nevada leads the series 23–11–2 as of 2022.

The SJSU and Nevada campuses are located approximately 250 miles apart. The football teams have competed in the same conferences since 1992, first in the Big West Conference in the 1990s and then in the 2000s as members of the WAC. Since 2013, the two teams are West Division rivals in the Mountain West.

Both schools are the oldest public institutions of higher education in their respective states of California and Nevada. SJSU was founded in 1857 while UNR was founded in 1874.

University of the Pacific
Battle for the Victor's Bell

The now defunct, 100-year rivalry matchup between the SJSU Spartans and the Pacific Tigers began in 1895 and ended in 1995 when Pacific dropped its football program. The Spartan-Tiger football game was played 72 times between 1895 and 1995.

Due to the "private vs. public" institutional competitiveness and the close geographical proximity of the two schools, a natural "cross-town" rivalry was born. University of the Pacific was founded in 1851 in Santa Clara, California, and claims to be the first institution of higher education in California. San José State University was founded in 1857 and is California's first public institution of higher education. 

In 1949, in a game which drew national attention, the "Victor's Bell" was unveiled. The Victor's Bell would go to the winner of subsequent Tiger-Spartan games. The bell was two feet tall and waist-high on a rolling cart. The bell was half black with an orange "P" for Pacific and half blue with a gold "SJ" for San Jose.

The Spartans led the series 43–23–6 when the rivalry ended at the close of the 1995 season.

AP poll rankings

As of December 2021, San Jose State has spent eight weeks ranked among the top–25 college football teams in the nation in the Associated Press college football poll. This includes two post–season top–25 rankings.

Head coaches

San Jose State has had 31 head football coaches. There have been four periods in which the Spartans did not host a team (1894, 1896–1897, 1901–1920, 1943–1945).

Retired numbers

In 2019, Dave Chaney was the first and thus far only Spartan to have his number retired. Chaney was a two-time All America linebacker who played for the Spartans from 1969-1971. In his three seasons, he established school career records for tackles, interception return yardage and interceptions returned for a touchdown. His 527 career tackles in just three seasons remains a San Jose State record. Although Chaney was drafted by the Kansas City Chiefs in 1972, he turned down the offer to pursue a career in education.

Individual awards and honors

National awards

American Football Coaches Association Region 5 Coach of the Year
Brent Brennan (2020)

Amos Alonzo Stagg Award
Pop Warner (1948)
Bill Walsh (2008)
Dick Tomey (2020)

Corbett Award
Bob Bronzan (2005)

Disney's Wide World of Sports Spirit Award
Neil Parry, KR/ PR (2003)

Lombardi Foundation Coach of the Year
Brent Brennan (2020)

National Football Foundation James J. Campbell National Scholar-Athlete Award
Tim Crawley, WR, RB, KR (2016)

Pop Warner Memorial Trophy
Chon Gallegos, QB (1961)
Mike Perez, QB (1987)

Reds Bagnell Award
Dick Vermeil (2013)

UPI Offensive Player of the Year
Mike Perez, QB (1986)

Walter Camp Distinguished American Award
Bill Walsh (2003)
Dick Vermeil (2006)

Conference awards

Mountain West Conference awards
MWC Coach of the Year
Brent Brennan (2020)

MWC Player of the Year
Jack Snyder, LT (2020)

MWC Defensive Player of the Year
Cade Hall, DL (2020)
Viliami Fehoko, DL (2022)

MWC Offensive Player of the Year
Josh Love, QB (2019)

Western Athletic Conference awards

WAC Defensive Player of the Year
Travis Johnson (2012)

WAC Defensive Player of the Year
Jarron Gilbert (2008) (Co-DPOY with Hawaii's Solomon Elimimian)

Big West Conference awards

Big West Coach of the Year
Terry Shea (1990)

Big West Defensive Player of the Year
Lyneil Mayo, OLB (1990)

Big West Offensive Player of the Year
Sheldon Canley, TB (1990)
Mike Perez, QB (1987)

All-Americans
As of 2022, SJSU has produced over 90 All-America team members, including seven first-team selections, 20 second- and third-team selections, and over 65 honorable mentions.

Note: List below does not include honorable mention selections.

Pro Football Hall of Fame

Two former SJSU players have been inducted into the Pro Football Hall of Fame. Bill Walsh attended San Jose State, where he played quarterback from 1953 to 1955. He went on to win three Super Bowls as the head coach of the San Francisco 49ers. 

Dick Vermeil played for San Jose State as a backup quarterback before graduating in 1959 with a master's degree. Vermeil later won Super Bowl XXXIV in 1999 as the head coach of the St. Louis Rams.

College Football Hall of Fame

Two former SJSU players have been inducted into the College Football Hall of Fame. Willie Heston attended San Jose State, where he played halfback from 1898 to 1900 before transferring to the University of Michigan. Heston has been named one of the greatest halfbacks in college football history.  

Terry Donahue was a freshman walk-on defensive tackle for one year at San Jose State before transferring to UCLA. Donahue was inducted into the College Football Hall of Fame for his contributions as the head coach at UCLA. 

Two former San Jose State coaches are also enshrined in the College Football Hall of Fame, mostly for their contributions while coaching at other schools. Pop Warner led his teams to a combined four national championships while serving as the head coach at Pitt and Stanford. 

John Ralston led Stanford to multiple Rose Bowl victories before taking over as the head coach at SJSU from 1993–1996. Ralston was inducted into the College Football Hall of Fame as a coach in 1992.

San Jose State players in the NFL

As of December 2022, 139 San Jose State players have gone on to play in the NFL, and five former Spartans are actively playing in the NFL. The 139 players include 121 draftees, six NFL Pro Bowl selections, six first-round draft picks, two MVP award winners, and one NFL Rookie of the Year.

Along with Miami (OH), Dayton, Arkansas, Eastern Illinois, and Pacific, SJSU is one of only six programs in the nation to produce more than one alumnus who would go on to coach Super Bowl-winning teams.

Current athletes in the NFL
As of December 2022, there are five former San Jose State players in the NFL.

All-time record vs. current Mountain West teams
Record at the conclusion of the 2022 NCAA Division I FBS football season.

Notable players and alumni

 Courtney Anderson — former NFL tight end, Atlanta Falcons and Oakland Raiders
Marcus Arroyo — former head football coach, UNLV
 Stacey Bailey — former NFL wide receiver, Atlanta Falcons
Brent Berry — 1964 MVP and former tackle drafted as junior by Oakland Raiders, Los Angeles Rams; played in CFL for the Edmonton Eskimos (CFL)
 Kim Bokamper — former NFL linebacker, Miami Dolphins
 John Broussard — former NFL wide receiver, Jacksonville Jaguars
 Gill Byrd — former NFL defensive back, San Diego Chargers; two NFL Pro Bowl appearances
 Jim Cadile — former NFL guard, Chicago Bears
 Matt Castelo — former NFL linebacker, Seattle Seahawks; former CFL linebacker, Hamilton Tiger-cats
 Andre Chachere — NFL safety, Philadelphia Eagles
 Steve Clarkson — nationally renowned quarterbacks coach; founder of Steve Clarkson Dreammaker quarterback camp
 Sherman Cocroft — former NFL defensive back, Kansas City Chiefs
 Clarence Cunningham — former AFL wide receiver, defensive back, running back, and kick returner; former AF2 starter, Stockton Lightning; IFL free safety, Catania Elephants
 Neal Dahlen — former SJSU quarterback, NFL manager and scout; holds the record for the most earned Super Bowl rings at seven.
 Rashied Davis — former NFL wide receiver, Chicago Bears
 Yonus Davis — former CFL running back, BC Lions
 Steve DeBerg — former NFL quarterback, Dallas Cowboys
 David Diaz-Infante — former NFL and CFL offensive guard, San Diego Chargers, Denver Broncos, Philadelphia Eagles, and Sacramento Gold Miners
 Terry Donahue — former UCLA head football coach; College Football Hall of Fame inductee (attended SJSU for one year)
 Leon Donohue — former NFL guard, Dallas Cowboys and San Francisco 49ers; 1962 NLF All-Rookie team
 Carl Ekern — former NFL linebacker, Los Angeles Rams; one NFL Pro Bowl appearance
 Tyler Ervin — former NFL running back, Jacksonville Jaguars and Houston Texans
 David Fales — former NFL quarterback, New York Jets, Miami Dolphins and Chicago Bears
 Matt Faulkner — former CFL quarterback For Ottawa RedBlacks
 Wilson Faumuina — former NFL defensive tackle, Atlanta Falcons
 Mervyn Fernandez — former NFL wide receiver, Los Angeles Raiders
 Coye Francies  — former NFL defensive back, Cleveland Browns 
 Chon Gallegos  — former NFL quarterback with the Oakland Raiders
 Jeff Garcia — former NFL quarterback, San Francisco 49ers, Tampa Bay Buccaneers, Philadelphia Eagles, et al.; four NFL Pro Bowl appearances
 Trestin George — former AFL and CFL wide receiver, San Jose Sabercats and BC Lions
 Jarron Gilbert – former NFL defensive tackle, Chicago Bears Named 2008 Western Athletic Conference Co-Defensive Player of the Year.
 Charlie Harraway — former NFL running back, Washington Redskins and Cleveland Browns
 Jelani Hawkins — former NFL tackle, Houston Texans 
 Paul Held — former NFL quarterback, Pittsburgh Steelers and Green Bay Packers
 Willie Heston — former SJSU halfback;  College Football Hall of Fame inductee (attended SJSU from 1898 to 1900; graduated from University of Michigan)
 James Hodgins — former NFL fullback, St. Louis Rams et al.
 Duke Ihenacho — former NFL safety, Washington Redskins and Denver Broncos
 Randy Johnson — former MLB Baseball Player, Atlanta Braves
 Johnny Johnson — former NFL running back, Phoenix Cardinals, New York Jets and San Francisco 49ers; one NFL Pro Bowl appearance; consensus choice for Rookie of the Year (1990)
 Travis Johnson - former NFL linebacker San Francisco 49ers. Named 2012 Western Athletic Conference Defensive Player of the Year.
 Cody Jones — former NFL defensive tackle, Los Angeles Rams; one NFL Pro Bowl appearance
 James Jones — former NFL wide receiver, Oakland Raiders and Green Bay Packers
 Kevin Jurovich — former NFL wide receiver, Philadelphia Eagles; San Francisco 49ers
 Rick Kane — former NFL running back, Detroit Lions
 Keala Keanaaina — former American football fullback
 Bob Ladouceur — among winningest high school football coaches in U.S. history; coached De La Salle High Spartans to 151 consecutive wins from 1992 to 2003
 Bill Leavy — former NFL referee; officiated Super Bowl XL
 Josh Love — former NFL quarterback for the Los Angeles Rams and the Cleveland Browns.
 Dwight Lowery — former NFL defensive back, New York Jets and two-time All-American at SJSU
 Ken Lutz — former Arena Football League quarterback, Columbus Thunderbolts, San Antonio Force,  player
 Frank Manumaleuga — former NFL linebacker, Kansas City Chiefs
 Lyneil Mayo — former NFL Europe linebacker, Frankfurt Galaxy; 1990 Big West Conference Defensive Player of the Year
 Frank Minini — former NFL halfback, Chicago Bears, Pittsburgh Steelers
 Joe Nedney — former kicker for eight NFL teams including the San Francisco 49ers
 William Yaw Obeng — former Arena Football League lineman, San Jose Sabercats
 Josh Oliver — NFL tight end, Baltimore Ravens
 Chris Owens — former NFL defensive back, Atlanta Falcons
Neil Parry — former SJSU football safety; Most Courageous Athlete Award winner (Philadelphia Sports Writers Association, 2003)
 Mike Perez — former NFL quarterback, New York Giants Named 1987 Big West Conference Offensive Player of the year, 1987 Pop Warner Trophy recipient and 1986 National UPI Player of the Year.
 Tom Petithomme — former Arena Football League player, San Jose Sabercats
 Art Powell — former NFL wide receiver, Oakland Raiders; Raiders' 7th all-time leading receiver
 Waylon Prather — former NFL punter, New Orleans Saints, New York Jets and Arizona Cardinals
 David Quessenberry — NFL offensive tackle, Buffalo Bills, Tennessee Titans and Houston Texans; Cancer survivor
 David Richmond — former NFL wide receiver, Cincinnati Bengals
 Scott Rislov — former Arena Football League quarterback, San Jose Sabercats
 Saint Saffold — former NFL player, Cincinnati Bengals
 Al Saunders — former NFL head coach for the San Diego Chargers
 Wes Schweitzer — NFL offensive guard, Atlanta Falcons
 Rufus Skillern — former CFL and NFL wide receiver, BC Lions and Baltimore Ravens
 Gerald Small — former NFL defensive back, Miami Dolphins
 Keith Smith — NFL fullback and former linebacker, Atlanta Falcons, Oakland Raiders and Dallas Cowboys
 Shane Smith — former NFL fullback, New York Giants and New Orleans Saints
 Carl Sullivan — former NFL defensive end, Green Bay Packers
 Adam Tafralis — former CFL quarterback, Hamilton Tiger-Cats
 Tyson Thompson — former NFL kick returner, Dallas Cowboys
 Bob Titchenal — former NFL linebacker, Washington Redskins and Los Angeles Dons; one NFL Pro Bowl appearance; former head football coach, New Mexico and SJSU
 Dick Vermeil — former NFL head coach; winning coach, Super Bowl XXXIV; Pro Football Hall of Fame inductee.
 Bill Walsh — NFL head coach; winning coach, Super Bowl XVI, Super Bowl XIX, and Super Bowl XXIII; Pro Football Hall of Fame inductee
 Gerald Willhite — former NFL running back, Denver Broncos
 Billy Wilson — former NFL receiver, San Francisco 49ers; six NFL Pro Bowl appearances
 Louis Wright — former NFL defensive back, Denver Broncos; 1st round NFL draft pick; five NFL Pro Bowl appearances
 Roy Zimmerman — former NFL quarterback, Washington Redskins; one NFL Pro Bowl appearance

Future non-conference opponents
Announced schedules as of March 23, 2022.

References

External links

 

 
American football teams established in 1892
1892 establishments in California